Phil Puleo is an American composer, drummer, illustrator and visual artist from New York. He is known as a founding member of the band Cop Shoot Cop in the 1990s, and for his current involvement in the experimental rock group Swans. He has also collaborated with Swans leader Michael Gira on his Angels of Light musical project. After briefly touring with Swans during the mid-nineties, Puleo joined the band as a full-time member in 2010.

Discography

Cop Shoot Cop

Red Expendables

Swans

Other appearances

References

External links
 
 

American industrial musicians
American rock drummers
Noise rock musicians
Cop Shoot Cop members
Living people
American noise musicians
Swans (band) members
Year of birth missing (living people)
Place of birth missing (living people)
Human Impact members